The 2019–20 Minnesota Golden Gophers men's ice hockey season was the 99th season of play for the program. They represented the University of Minnesota in the 2019–20 NCAA Division I men's ice hockey season. This season marked the 30th season in the Big Ten Conference. They were coached by Bob Motzko, in his second season, and played their home games at 3M Arena at Mariucci.

On March 12, 2020, the Big Ten announced that the tournament was cancelled due to the coronavirus pandemic.

Roster

As of September 14, 2019.

Standings

Schedule and results

|-
!colspan=12 style="color:white; background:#862334; " | Exhibition

|-
!colspan=12 style="color:white; background:#862334; " | Regular Season

|- 
!colspan=12 style="color:white; background:#862334; " | 

|-
!colspan=12 style="color:white; background:#862334; " | Regular Season

|-
!colspan=12 style="color:white; background:#862334; " | 

|- align="center" bgcolor="#e0e0e0"
|colspan=12|Minnesota Won Series 2–1
|- align="center" bgcolor="#e0e0e0"
|colspan=12|Remainder of Tournament Cancelled

Scoring statistics

Goaltending statistics

Rankings

Players drafted into the NHL

2020 NHL Entry Draft

† incoming freshman

References

External links

Minnesota Golden Gophers men's ice hockey seasons
Minnesota
Minnesota
Minnesota Golden Gophers
Minnesota Golden Gophers